Leipzig-Connewitz is a railway station in the city of Leipzig, Germany. The station is located on the Leipzig–Hof railway and Leipzig Hbf–Leipzig-Connewitz railway. Since December 2013 the station is served by the S-Bahn Mitteldeutschland, a subsidiary of Deutsche Bahn.

History
The station was opened on 10 July 1889 as Connewitz loading point (Ladestelle). The connection from Connewitz to Leipzig was opened in 1891. The station was opened on 1 November 1893 as a halt (Haltestelle) and renamed Leipzig-Connewitz in 1897. The halt was reclassified as a station in 1905.

The station is a railway junction in southern Leipzig. Between 1888 and 1925, the Leipzig-Connewitz–Plagwitz railway connected the industrial area of Plagwitz to the Saxon State Railways network. Between 1876 and 2012, the Leipzig Hbf–Leipzig-Connewitz railway (known as the Zweite Verbindungsbahn—"second connecting railway") ran from Leipzig Hauptbahnhof (called Leipzig-Dresdener Bahnhof until 1915). The section of the Leipzig-Engelsdorf–Leipzig-Connewitz railway (which was opened in 1906) between the former Tabakmühle junction and Leipzig-Connewitz was closed in 2012 and dismantled with the opening of the S-Bahn Mitteldeutschland in 2013. Leipzig-Connewitz was the starting point of the Leipzig–Hof line during the reconstruction of the line to connect with the new City Tunnel. The remaining part of the Leipzig Hbf–Leipzig-Connewitz route from Stötteritz runs past the station. The S-Bahn trains run between Connewitz and Gaschwitz over the suburban tracks, line number 6377. There are platforms exits only on the suburban tracks, which were built on the former long-distance tracks and opened in 2013.

Train services
The following services currently call at the station:

References

External links

Connewitz
Railway stations in Germany opened in 1889